Gabriel Davi Gomes Sara (born 26 June 1999), simply known as Gabriel Sara, is a Brazilian professional footballer who  plays for Norwich City as an attacking midfielder.

Club career

São Paulo
Sara made his debut for São Paulo on 3 December 2017, in a 1–1 draw with Bahia, for the Brazilian Championship.

The midfielder leaves São Paulo where he made 114 games and 17 goals with the tricolor shirt.

Norwich
On 15 July 2022, EFL Championship club Norwich City agreed a £6 million transfer fee plus add-ons with São Paulo for Sara, with the player committing to a contract until 2026. Sara made his debut for Norwich on 6th August 2022, coming on as a substitute for the injured Max Aarons in a 1–1 draw with Wigan Athletic. Sara scored his first goal for Norwich in a 3–2 loss to Preston North End, and scored again three weeks later in a 3–1 win against Stoke City at Carrow Road.

Sara would score again in Norwich's 3–1 win over Hull City on 14 February 2023, before netting in back-to-back games in the Canaries' 2–0 win over Cardiff City, and scoring the winner in a 3–2 victory away to play-off chasing Millwall.

Career statistics

Honours
São Paulo
Campeonato Paulista: 2021

References

External links

1999 births
Living people
Brazilian footballers
People from Joinville
Sportspeople from Santa Catarina (state)
Association football midfielders
São Paulo FC players
Norwich City F.C. players
Campeonato Brasileiro Série A players
Brazilian expatriate footballers
Brazilian expatriate sportspeople in England
Expatriate footballers in England